Caroline was a 40-gun  of the French Navy, launched in 1806. She captured several small British vessels in 1807, including a 14-gun privateer. She was ordered to the Indian Ocean in 1808 for commerce raiding, arriving in 1809. During the subsequent Mauritius campaign, Caroline captured two East Indiamen and their valuable cargoes of trade goods in the action of 31 May 1809.

The British captured Caroline at Île Bourbon during the Raid on Saint Paul in September 1809, renaming her HMS Bourbonaise as they already had a ship named Caroline in service. Bourbonaise sailed back to Plymouth where she was held in ordinary until 1816, when she was sold for breaking up.

Service history

Actions in 1807
On 30 November 1807 Caroline captured Charlotte, which Caroline set afire and sank. A week later, on 6 December, Caroline captured the privateer Caesar, which she also set on fire and sank. Caesar was a brig of 217 tons (bm), armed with fourteen 6-pounders and two 18-pounder carronades. Her master, Robert Harrison, had received his letter of marque on 1 January 1807.

Indian Ocean mission and capture 
On 12 November 1808, the French authorities sent four new 40-gun frigates to the Indian Ocean, one of them Caroline, under the command of Captain Jean-Baptiste Billard. Caroline sailed from Vlissingen in the Netherlands.

Manche was another of the four; she had sailed from Cherbourg.

Caroline captured several ships, notably two East Indiamen  and Europa on 31 May 1809, before returning to Saint-Paul. A third East Indiaman, escaped. Prize crews took Streatham and Europa to Réunion, where the British recaptured them on 21 September.

While Billard was suffering from very serious illness, Caroline was under the command of his first mate lieutenant de vaisseau Feretier. He was Carolines commander on 21 September when  and  captured her during the British Raid on Saint-Paul.

HMS Bourbonaise

Bourbonnaise was commissioned under Captain Robert Corbett shortly after her capture. He sailed her to Plymouth, where she arrived 16 February 1810. The Admiralty paid her off and laid her up in ordinary. She never went to sea again.

Fate
The Admiralty attempted to auction Bourbonaise at Plymouth on 18 September 1816 at £2500, but bidding stopped at £2000. She was broken up in April 1817.

Citations

References
 
 

Age of Sail frigates of France
Ships built in France
1806 ships
Hortense-class frigates
Captured ships
Frigates of the Royal Navy